Unfinished Symphony is a 1934 British-Austrian musical drama film directed by Willi Forst and Anthony Asquith and starring Mártha Eggerth, Helen Chandler, Hans Jaray, and Ronald Squire. The film is based on the story of Franz Schubert who, in the 1820s left his symphony unfinished after losing the love of his life. The film's alternate German-language version was called Gently My Songs Entreat. This title refers to the first line of the Lied "Ständchen" (Serenade) from Schubert's collection Schwanengesang, "the most famous serenade in the world", performed by Mártha Eggerth in the film.

Cast
 Mártha Eggerth as Caroline Esterhazy
 Hans Jaray as Franz Schubert
 Cecil Humphreys as Antonio Salieri
 Helen Chandler as Emmie Passenter
 Ronald Squire as Count Esterhazy
 Esmé Percy as Huettenbrenner
 Eliot Makeham as Joseph Passenter
 Paul Wagner as Lieutenant Folliot
 Hermine Sperler as Princess Kinsky
 Beryl Laverick as Mary Esterhazy
 Brember Wills as Esterhazy's Secretary

Critical reception
The New York Times wrote, "with a happy unconcern for dismal historical truths, the agreeable little musical film at the Roxy pursues the history of Franz Schubert's glorious B Minor symphony along the silken paths of romance...Hans Jaray's performance reveals Schubert as a gentle and sad-faced youth, inordinately sensitive and at the same time filled with modest confidence in his genius. The well-known German actress and singer, Marta Eggerth, is the lovely aristocrat who laughed at the wrong time, and she helps the photoplay considerably with the warmth and skill of her interpretations of the Schubert songs. Helen Chandler pouts agreeably as the unhappy pawnshop maiden who loved the composer though his heart belonged to another. Despite its mediocre and sometimes wretched photography, Unfinished Symphony provides a politely winning background for the immortal lieder of the great composer."

References

External links

1934 films
British historical musical films
Austrian historical musical films
Austrian biographical films
British biographical drama films
Films directed by Anthony Asquith
Films directed by Willi Forst
1930s English-language films
Austrian multilingual films
1930s musical drama films
Films about classical music and musicians
Films about composers
1930s biographical drama films
Wiener Film
British musical drama films
Films set in the 1820s
Cultural depictions of Franz Schubert
Cultural depictions of Antonio Salieri
1930s historical musical films
Austrian musical drama films
1934 multilingual films
British multilingual films
1934 drama films
1930s British films
1930s German films